The Forever Man is a novel by Gordon R. Dickson published in 1986.

Plot summary
The Forever Man is a novel in which people can transfer their minds into spaceships.

Reception
Dave Langford reviewed The Forever Man for White Dwarf #95, and stated that "Mostly it's good, solid entertainment with some thoughtful asides - though I'm never very convinced when a grim emotional impasse is transformed into a very happy boy-meets-girl ending in just a few lines of dialogue on the last page."

Reviews
Review by Dan Chow (1986) in Locus, #307 August 1986
Review by Fernando Q. Gouvêa (1986) in Fantasy Review, October 1986
Review by Baird Searles (1987) in Isaac Asimov's Science Fiction Magazine, January 1987
Review by Chris Henderson (1987) in Starlog, #114 January 1987
Review by Don D'Ammassa (1987) in Science Fiction Chronicle, #88 January 1987
Review by Ken Lake (1987) in Vector 136
Review by E. F. Bleiler (1987) in Rod Serling's The Twilight Zone Magazine, April 1987
Review by Tom Easton (1987) in Analog Science Fiction/Science Fact, May 1987

References

1986 American novels
1986 science fiction novels
Ace Books books
American science fiction novels
Novels by Gordon R. Dickson